Artyom Artemyev (born January 3, 1993) is a Russian professional ice hockey goaltender. He is currently an unrestricted free agent who most recently played with HC Sochi of the Kontinental Hockey League (KHL).

Artemyev made his Kontinental Hockey League debut playing with Severstal Cherepovets during the 2013–14 KHL season.

References

External links

1993 births
Living people
Atlant Moscow Oblast players
Russian ice hockey goaltenders
Severstal Cherepovets players
HC Sochi players
Sportspeople from Yaroslavl